Podolia or Podilia is a historic region in Eastern Europe, located in the west-central and south-western parts of Ukraine and in northeastern Moldova (i.e. northern Transnistria). The name derives from Old Slavic po, meaning "by/next to/along" and dol, "valley" (see dale).

Geography

The area is part of the vast East European Plain, confined by the Dniester River and the Carpathian arc in the southwest. In the same direction run two ranges of relatively low hills, separated by the Southern Bug.

Podolia lies east of historic Red Ruthenia, i.e. the eastern half of Galicia, beyond the Seret River, a tributary of the Dniester. In the northwest, it borders on Volhynia. It is largely made up of the present-day Ukrainian Vinnytsia Oblast and southern and central Khmelnytskyi Oblast. The Podolian lands also include parts of the adjacent Ternopil Oblast in the west and Kyiv Oblast in the northeast. In the east it consists of the neighbouring parts of Cherkasy, Kirovohrad and Odesa Oblasts, as well as the northern half of Transnistria.

Two large rivers, with numerous tributaries, drain the region: the Dniester, which forms its boundary with Moldova and is navigable throughout its length, and the Southern Bug, which flows almost parallel to the former in a higher, sometimes swampy, valley, interrupted in several places by rapids. The Dniester forms an important channel for trade in the areas of Mohyliv-Podilskyi, Zhvanets, and other Podolian river ports.

In Podolia, 'black earth' (chernozem) soil predominates, making it a very fertile agricultural area. Marshes occur only beside the Bug.

Russian-ruled Podolia in 1906 had an estimated population of 3,543,700, consisting chiefly of Ukrainians. Significant minorities included Poles and Jews, as well as 50,000 Romanians, some Germans, and some Armenians.

The chief settlements include Kamianets-Podilskyi, the traditional capital, Vinnytsia, Khmelnytskyi, Rîbnița, Mohyliv-Podilskyi, Haisyn, Balta, Bar, Camenca, Yampil, Bratslav, and Letychiv.

Podolia is known for its cherries, mulberries, melons, gourds, and cucumbers.

History
The country has had human inhabitants since at least the beginning of the Neolithic period. Herodotus mentions it as the seat of the Graeco-Scythian Alazones and possibly Scythian Neuri. Subsequently, the Dacians and the Getae arrived. The Romans left traces of their rule in Trajan's Wall, which stretches through the modern districts of Kamianets-Podilskyi, Nova Ushytsia, and Khmelnytskyi.

During the Great Migration Period, many nationalities passed through this territory or settled within it for some time, leaving numerous traces in archaeological remains. Nestor in the Primary Chronicle mentions four apparently Slavic tribes: the Buzhans and Dulebes along the Southern Bug River, and the Tivertsi and Ulichs along the Dniester. The Avars invaded in the 7th century. Later the Bolokhoveni occupied the same territory in the 13th century.

Kingdom of Ruthenia and Polish Crown
Prince Oleg of Novgorod extended his rule over this territory known as the Ponizie, or "lowlands." These lowlands later became a part of the Rus' principalities of Volhynia, Kyiv, and Galicia. In the 13th century, Bakota served as its political and administrative centre. During that time, the Mongols plundered Ponizie; Algirdas (Olgierd), prince of the Grand Duchy of Lithuania, freed it from their rule following his victory against the Golden Horde in the Battle of Blue Waters of 1362, annexing it to his territories under the name of Podolia, which has the same meaning as Ponizie. Polish colonisation began in the 14th century.

After the death of the Lithuanian prince Vytautas (Vitovt) in 1430, Podolia was incorporated into Podolian Voivodeship of the Polish Crown, with the exception of its eastern part, the Province of Bratslav, which remained with Lithuania until its union with Poland in the Union of Lublin of 1569. From 1672, Podolia became part of the Ottoman Empire, when and where it was known as Podolia Eyalet. During this time, it was a province, with its center being Kamaniçe, and was divided into the sanjaks of Kamaniçe, Bar, Mejibuji and Yazlovets (Yazlofça). It returned to Polish overlordship in 1699. The Poles retained Podolia until the partitions of their country in 1772 and 1793, when the Austrian Habsburg monarchy and Imperial Russia annexed the western and eastern parts respectively.

Russian Empire

From 1793 to 1917, part of the region was the Podolia Governorate (Russian: Подольская губерния [Podol’skaja gubernija]; Ukrainian: Подільська губернія [Podil’s’ka hubernija]) in southwestern Russia bordering with Austria across the Zbruch River and with Bessarabia across the Dniester.

In 1772 First Partition of Poland, the Austrian Habsburgs had taken control of a small part of Podolia west of the Zbruch River (sometimes also called "Southern Podolia") around Borschiv, in what is today Ternopil Oblast. At this time, Emperor Joseph II toured the area, was impressed by the fertility of the soil, and was optimistic about its future prospects. Poland disappeared as a state in a third partition in 1795 but the Polish gentry continued to maintain local control in both eastern and western Podolia over a peasant population which was primarily ethnically Ukrainian whose similarity to the other East Slavs already subject to the Habsburg monarchy was showcased in a 1772 book by Adam F. Kollár and was used as an argument in favor of annexation by the Habsburgs. The Ternopil (Tarnopol) region of western Podolia was briefly taken by Russia in 1809 but reverted to Austrian rule in 1815. Within the Austrian Empire, western Podolia was part of the Kingdom of Galicia and Lodomeria which, in 1867 with the formation of Austria-Hungary, became an ethnic Pole-administered autonomous unit under the Austrian crown. At the end of the nineteenth century and the beginning of the twentieth, Austrian Podolia witnessed a large-scale emigration of its peasant population to western Canada.

As to the Jewish community in Podolia, the Haskalah or Jewish Englightenment reached it in the 19th century, introduced by Jews from Western Europe. Says I A. Bar-Levy (Weissman), author of the "Yizkor Book" for Podolia: "It brought an end to the cultural separation of Jews from the surrounding world. Jews began to learn modern sciences and languages, read world literature and participate in the cultural life of the nations among whom they lived." Just as was the case in other areas of former Poland, Jews started to learn the language of the country they lived in and to write about secular subjects. The writers of the Haskalah in Podolia included: the forerunner Isaac Satanow (1733–1805), Menachim Mendel Lapin, author and translator, Ben-Ami (Mordecai Rabinowitz), who wrote in Russian, and many others.

Between Poland and the Soviet Union
With the collapse of Austria-Hungary following World War I in November 1918, western Podolia was included in the West Ukrainian People's Republic, but came under Polish control in 1919 which was confirmed in the Poland–Ukrainian People's Republic agreement in April 1920. Podolia was briefly occupied in 1920 by Soviets during the course of the Polish–Soviet War. At same war, Poland briefly occupied eastern Podolia in 1919 and again in 1920. After the Peace of Riga the Polish control of western Podolia was recognized by the USSR. USSR retained eastern Podalia. There were pogroms during this period.

In Poland from 1921 to 1939, western Podolia was part of the Tarnopol Voivodeship. Eastern Podolia remained in the Ukrainian SSR and between 1922 and 1940, in the southwestern part, the Moldavian Autonomous Soviet Socialist Republic was created.

In 1927 there was a massive uprising of peasants and factory workers in Mohyliv-Podilskyi, Kamianets-Podilskyi, Tiraspol and other cities of southern Ukrainian SSR against Soviet authorities. Troops from Moscow were sent to the region and suppressed the unrest, causing around 4000 deaths, according to US correspondents sent to report about the insurrection, which was at the time completely denied by the Kremlin official press.

In 1939 after the signing of the Molotov–Ribbentrop Pact between Nazi Germany and the Soviet Union and the Soviet invasion of Poland on September 17, 1939, the area became part of Soviet Ukraine. Many local inhabitants were deported to labour camps. Following German invasion of the Soviet Union in 1941, most of Podolia was occupied by Nazi Germany and incorporated into the Reichskommissariat Ukraine. The area of Podolia between the Southern Bug below Vinnytsia and the Dniester was occupied by Axis Romania as part of Transnistria.

Starting in July 1941, the Jewish inhabitants were subjected to mass extermination by shooting in a German campaign carried out by four Einsatzgruppen ("operational groups") specially organized for the purpose. Reliable estimates including German, Soviet, and local records indicate that upwards of 1.6 million, perhaps as many as 2 million, Jews were murdered in this fashion. Most were buried in mass graves, but there were also instances of communities being forced en masse into community buildings or synagogues that were then burnt, or herded into local mines that were subsequently dynamited.

In 1944 the Soviets regained Podolia and in 1945, when Poland's eastern border was formally realigned along the Curzon line, the whole of Podolia remained in the Ukrainian Soviet Socialist Republic. Most remaining Poles and Jews fled or were expelled to the People's Republic of Poland.

Culture 
The Podillia's folk icon-painting tradition is well known in Ukraine. Its manifestation is long home iconostases painted on canvas at the end of the 19th to the beginning of the 20th centuries. Red, green and yellow colours prevail, the faces of the saints are a little bit longer, their eyes almond-like. On these iconostases, the most venerated family saints were painted. The collections of Podillya's folk iconostases are possessed by Vinnytsya Art Museum and The Museum of Ukrainian Home Icons in the Radomysl Castle.

Notable people
 

 Wawrzyniec Dayczak (1882–1968), architect and activist

Gallery

References

The Road From Letichev, Chapin & Weinstock, Writers' Showcase 2000

External links
 Volodymyr Kubijovyč, Ihor Stebelsky, Mykhailo Zhdan, Podilia in the Encyclopedia of Ukraine, vol. 4 (1993). It was slightly updated in 2010. 
Map of Podolia (1882)
 The Official Site of the Radomysl Castle 
 Petrov N. (1891) Podolia. A Historical Description (Подолия. Историческое описание) at Runivers.ru in DjVu and PDF formats

 
Historical regions
Historical regions in Ukraine
Geography of Vinnytsia Oblast
Geography of Khmelnytskyi Oblast
History of Vinnytsia Oblast
History of Khmelnytskyi Oblast
Holocaust locations in Ukraine